Cavendish is an English surname, deriving from a place name in Suffolk. Etymologically, it is believed to derive from Old English , a personal byname from  'bold, daring', plus  'enclosure; enclosed pasture'. The Cavendish noble family has generally been considered to be a branch of the same Anglo-Norman baronial lineage as Gernon (of Essex, Suffolk, and Derby, originally Guernon of Normandy) and de Montfichet/Mountfitchet (of Essex, Middlesex, and London, originally Montfiquet of Normandy), though not without some critics of this hypothesis. Shortened forms of the name (via Middle English spellings like Cauendish and Caundish) have included Candish and Cantis/Candis, though the latter has also been independently derived from Candace/Candice, originally a Biblical given name.

Notable people surnamed Cavendish

Ada Cavendish (1839–1895), British actress
Anthony Cavendish (1927–2013), British intelligence officer
Camilla Cavendish (born 1968), British journalist
Lord Charles Cavendish (1704–1783), British nobleman, Whig politician and scientist
Charles Cavendish (1793–1863), British Liberal politician
George Cavendish (writer) ( – 1562) English writer and biographer of Cardinal Thomas Wolsey
Henry Cavendish (1731–1810), British physicist, discoverer of hydrogen
Lucy Cavendish (1841–1925), British pioneer of women's education
Margaret Cavendish, Duchess of Newcastle-upon-Tyne (1623–1673), English aristocrat, writer, and philosopher
Mark Cavendish (born 1985), Manx cyclist
Michael Cavendish (born ), English composer
Peregrine Cavendish, 12th Duke of Devonshire (born 1944), British Peer and owner of Pratt's Club
Lord Richard Cavendish (1752–1781), British MP
Lord Richard Cavendish (1871–1946), British MP, aristocrat, author, magistrate
Richard Cavendish (occult writer) (1930–2016), British writer on topics dealing with the occult
 Robin Cavendish (1930–1994), a British advocate for disabled people
Sid Cavendish (1876–1954), English footballer with Southampton and Clapton Orient
Thomas Cavendish (1560–1592), English admiral, and namesake of Cavendish tobacco
William Cavendish-Bentinck, 3rd Duke of Portland (1738–1809), Prime Minister of the United Kingdom

See also
House of Cavendish, the family of the dukes of Devonshire and Newcastle

References

English-language surnames
English toponymic surnames